The Rienz is a river in South Tyrol, Italy. Its source is located at 2,180 m of altitude, in the Dolomites mountains, south of Toblach: near Toblach it enters in the Puster Valley, and, after , it meets the Eisack river in the city of Brixen, at 550 m of altitude.

The Rienz flows through the following municipalities (source to mouth): Toblach, Niederdorf, Welsberg-Taisten, Olang, Rasen-Antholz, Bruneck, St. Lorenzen, Kiens, Vintl, Mühlbach, Rodeneck and Brixen.

The most significant affluents are:
 Ahr, forming the Ahrntal and responsible of 1/3 of the total discharge.
 Antholzer Bach.
 Gran Ega (Val Badia).
 Gsieser Bach.
 Pragser Bach.
 Pfunderer Bach.
 Wielenbach.

The maximum discharge of the Rienz is around 60 m³/s.

References 
 Information about the Rienz in German and Italian.

External links 

Rivers of South Tyrol
Rivers of Italy